Adrian Marian Apostol (born 11 March 1990) is a Romanian rugby union player. He plays as a wing.

Club career
He has played for CSA Steaua București, from 2010/11 to 2011/12, Farul Constanța, from 2011/12 to 2013/14, and plays for Baia Mare, since 2014/15. He also played for București Wolves, a team selected from the Romanian Championship, at international level.

International career
He has 22 caps for Romania, since his first game in 2011, with 6 tries scored, 30 points on aggregate. He was called as replacement player for the 2011 Rugby World Cup, where he played a single game. He was called once again for the 2015 Rugby World Cup, where he played in all the four games, one of them as a substitute, scoring 2 tries, 10 points on aggregate.

References

External links

 
 
 
 

1990 births
Living people
Romanian rugby union players
Romania international rugby union players
Rugby union wings
SCM Rugby Timișoara players
CSM Știința Baia Mare players
Sportspeople from Constanța